Giovanardi is an Italian surname. Notable people with the surname include:

 Carlo Giovanardi (born 1950), Italian politician
 Daniele Giovanardi (born 1950), Italian former sprinter
 Fabrizio Giovanardi (born 1966), Italian racing driver

Italian-language surnames